is a former Japanese football player and manager.

Playing career
Yoshida was born in Hiroshima on July 14, 1969. After graduating from Meiji University, he joined Kashima Antlers in 1992. However he could hardly play in the match. He moved to Shimizu S-Pulse in 1995 and played many matches. He moved to his local club Sanfrecce Hiroshima in 1996 and played as regular player. He left the club end of 1999 season and moved to Brazil. However he could not sign with a club and he returned to Japan. He signed with Shimizu S-Pulse in June 2000. The club won the champions 2001 Emperor's Cup. From 2004, he could hardly play in the match and he moved to Regional Leagues club FC Gifu in 2006. Although he could not play in the match, the club was promoted to Japan Football League in 2007 and J2 League in 2008. From 2009, he played for FC Oribe Tajimi (2009) and Fujieda MYFC (2009-10). He retired end of 2010 season.

Coaching career
After retirement, Yoshida became a coach for Yokogawa Musashino (later Tokyo Musashino City FC) in 2011. He became a manager in 2013. He resigned end of 2017 season.

Club statistics

References

External sources

1969 births
Living people
Meiji University alumni
Association football people from Hiroshima Prefecture
Japanese footballers
J1 League players
J2 League players
Japan Football League players
Kashima Antlers players
Shimizu S-Pulse players
Sanfrecce Hiroshima players
FC Gifu players
Fujieda MYFC players
Japanese football managers
Association football midfielders